Mastercard Cirrus is a worldwide interbank network that provides cash to Mastercard cardholders. As a subsidiary of Mastercard Inc., it connects all Mastercard credit, debit and prepaid cards, as well as ATM cards issued by various banks worldwide bearing the Mastercard / Maestro logo.

Founded in 1982, prior to its acquisition by Mastercard in 1987, Cirrus System, LLC was owned by Bank of Montreal, BayBanks Inc., First Interstate Bancorp, Mellon Bank, NBD Bancorp Inc. and Norwest Corp.

By default, Mastercard, Maestro cards are linked to the Cirrus network, but very often all three logotypes will be shown. Canadian, American and Saudi Arabian ATMs use this network alongside their local networks and many banks have adopted Cirrus as their international interbank network alongside either a local network, the rival Plus ATM network owned by Visa, or both. In countries such as India and Bangladesh, the Cirrus network also serves as a local interbank network as well as an international network.

Logos

The first logo, advertised from 1982 until 1992, was then changed to match those representing the other subsidiaries of Mastercard, which acquired Cirrus in 1987. The only exception is the colour pattern change. This can also be noticed through the re-branding in 2016, since all the logos of Mastercard, Maestro and Cirrus have been equally modified.

References

Further reading

External links

 Mastercard Profile
 Mastercard ATM Locator

Financial services companies established in 1982
1987 mergers and acquisitions
Interbank networks
Mastercard